Digimon Universe: App Monsters is a Japanese multimedia project created by Toei Company, Dentsu and Namco Bandai Holdings, under the pseudonym Akiyoshi Hongo. It is the eighth official installment of the Digimon franchise, but also considered as its own separate franchise from the original. An Anime adaptation of the franchise was animated by Toei Animation, produced by Dentsu, directed by Gō Koga and written by Yōichi Katō (Mushibugyo, Yo-kai Watch) with character designs by  Kenichi Ōnuki (Gundam Build Fighters). It began airing on all TXN stations in Japan on October 1, 2016, replacing Time Travel Girl in its original time slot.

Protagonists

Haru Shinkai

 is the male protagonist, a 13-year-old boy who likes reading and always saw himself as a secondary character, until he finds the AppliDrive and joins Gatchmon in his fight to stop Leviathan from taking over the world. His AppliDrive's color is red, later replaced by a red and gold AppliDrive DUO.

Gatchmon

 is Haru's Standard Grade partner Appmon, that is derived from a search app. He likes to look cool and his search function allows him to learn many things, including other people's secrets and the weak point of his enemies.

Gatchmon's Super Grade form, attained by Applinking with Navimon, combining Gatchmon's search abilities with Navimon's navigation capacity to become stronger and more agile.

Gatchmon's Ultimate Grade form, attained by Applinking DoGatchmon with Timemon. It is a global system Appmon with the power to search and attack millions of enemies at once on a global scale.

Gatchmon's God Grade form, which is attained by Applinking Globemon with Charismon. It is a creation Appmon.

Eri Karan

14 year old  is a member of the idol group "AppliYama 470". Cheerful and lively on the outside, she is actually very lonely. Her AppliDrive's color is blue, but is later replaced by a blue and gold AppliDrive DUO. She has a tendency to argue with Astra, due to their conflicting egos.

Dokamon

 is Eri's Standard Grade partner robot-like Appmon that was derived from an action game app. He has a strong and loyal attitude towards Eri, despite her habit of neglecting him and bossing him around.

Dokamon's Super Grade form, attained by Applinking with Perorimon. It resembles a sumo wrestler.

Dokamon's Ultimate Grade form, attained by Applinking Dosukomon with Coachmon. Based on a mixed martial arts game system.

Dokamon's God Grade form, attained by Applinking Oujamon with Beautymon. It is an invincibility Appmon.

Torajirou Asuka

 is an 11 year old free-spirited half-English, half-Japanese boy and a famous "Apptuber", who uploads videos to the site "Apptube" under the alias "Astra". He comes from a wealthy and traditional family and only spends 30 minutes per day making videos for Apptube, as he also intends to inherit his father's tea shop business. His AppliDrive's color is yellow, but is later replaced by a yellow and gold AppliDrive DUO.

Musimon

 is Torajirou's Standard Grade partner Rabbit-like Appmon which was derived from a music app, who likes to go with the flow, just like his partner.

Musimon's Super Grade form, attained by Applinking with Recormon. It resembles a rap singer.

Musimon's Ultimate Grade form, attained by Applinking Mediamon with Dreamon. Based on an entertainment home system.

Musimon's God Grade form, attained by Applinking Entermon with Fakemon. It is an arousal Appmon.

Rei Katsura

14 year old  is a mysterious hacker whose younger brother was kidnapped by Leviathan's followers. In spite of the fact that he is fighting Leviathan to rescue him, Rei refuses to cooperate with Haru and the others until they join forces to defeat Mienumon and he accompanies the group to the Deep Web. His AppliDrive's color is black, but is later replaced by a black and gold AppliDrive DUO.

Hackmon

 is Rei's Standard Grade partner Appmon with hacking abilities.

Hackmon's Super Grade form, attained by Applinking with Protecmon. It resembles a black dragon and has the capability of hacking not only their enemies, but the environment in order to gain the advantage in combat.

Hackmon's Ultimate Grade form, attained by Applinking Raidramon with Dezipmon. Based on a file restoration system.

Hackmon's God Grade form, attained by Applinking Revivemon with Biomon. It is a variation Appmon.

Yujin Ozora

 is a 13-year-old boy. Yujin is Haru's childhood friend and a hot-blooded guy who is good with sports and is popular with the girls. His AppliDrive DUO's color is purple and white. It is later revealed that he is actually an android named YJ-14, that was created by Leviathan for intelligence gathering, and that the woman who appeared as his mother is actually a researcher of L Corp who created his robotic body. After Leviathan's body is destroyed, it takes over Yujin's body and gives Haru two choices: either let both Leviathan and Yujin die or let humanity be enslaved forever. Haru is about to choose stopping Leviathan, but Yujin takes back control of his body and makes that decision himself, dying in the process.

Offmon

 is Yujin's Standard Grade partner Appmon, derived from an offline game app.

Offmon's Ultimate Grade form, based on a Forced Termination App. At first, he can't control its power, becoming vicious upon using it, until he is calmed down by Yujin.

Offmon's God Grade form, attained by Applinking Shutmon with Bootmon. It is a reboot Appmon.

Antagonists

Leviathan

 is the main antagonist of the series. It is an artificial intelligence hidden in the deep web spreading a virus known as the "L virus" that infects Appmons, turning them rogue. Gatchmon tends to panic just upon mentioning its name, a habit he is trying to shake off with time. Later Haru and the others learn from Timemon that Leviathan is a part of Minerva's code that went rogue. Its materialized form is a metallic six-headed dragon empowered by the data of humans digitalized by Deusmon and summoned into the real world by Yujin and Rebootmon. Later, it devours all six God Grade Appmon to evolve even further. Finding the Appmon capable of evolving to God Grade was the reason it started to spread the virus in the first place. After the Buddy Appmon managed to escape from Leviathan's body, the Applidrivers tried to access Tokyo High Tower to awaken Minerva who was sleeping inside a satellite orbiting Earth. Minerva temporarily stops Leviathan to allow the Buddy Appmon to escape and become the God Grade Appmon once again so they could destroy Levithan's body. However, Leviathan transported his remaining data inside Yujin's body. Haru is then given two choices: kill Yujin to delete Leviathan or spare Yujin and let humanity be enslaved. Haru is about to choose the former, but Yujin takes back control of his body in order to do that decision himself. as a result, Yujin's body shuts down and all of Leviathan's data is deleted.

Knight Unryūji

Originally a genius who developed a famous message app that was banned when people started misusing it,  is the new CEO of L Corp, a conglomerate under Leviathan's control. After Charismon subdues the AppliDrivers, he is betrayed by Leviathan, who intended to dispose of him after they are defeated, but is rescued when Haru uses Overdrive on Globemon to defeat the enemy instead. He then tells Rei where he can find info about Hajime's whereabouts.

Cameramon

 is a Standard Grade camera Appmon capable of seeing through any working camera to keep track of his enemies.

Cameramon's Super Grade form, attained by Applinking with Shotmon, and capable of sniping enemies from anywhere, even without a clear view with assistance from Cameramon's surveillance power. After being defeated by DoGatchmon, his Appmon chip is stolen by Mienumon.

Shotmon

 is a Standard Grade shooting Appmon capable of shooting his enemies in the blink of an eye.

Mienumon

 is a stealth Super Grade Appmon, capable of becoming invisible.

Mienumon's Ultimate Grade form, attained by Applinking with Sakusimon. She is defeated by the combined efforts of Haru, Eri, Torajirou and Rei.

Sakusimon

 is a simulation Super Grade Appmon. After being defeated by DoGatchmon who was Applinked with Raidramon, his Appmon chip is salvaged by Mienumon, who uses it to reach the Ultimate level.

Coachmon

 is a trainer Super Grade Appmon. He is sent by Mienumon to give Eri a training routine harsh enough to break her, but after being moved by her dedication, he reforms and joins forces with the AppliDrivers instead.

Cometmon

 is an Astronomical Ultimate Grade Appmon. It is defeated by Dantemon before he was turned into stone.

Satellamon

 is a GPS Ultimate Grade Appmon and a bounty hunter hired by Leviathan to take down the AppliDrivers. He is defeated by Shutmon who Applinked with Globemon and his chip is salvaged by Knight.

Virusmon

 is a Standard Grade virus Appmon octopus-like creature responsible for spreading the L Virus, and is capable of multiplying itself.

Charismon

 is a mind control Ultimate Grade Appmon and the leader of the Ultimate 4. He is defeated by Globemon with his chip being obtained by Haru.

Beautymon

 is a beauty Ultimate Grade Appmon and member of the Ultimate 4. She is defeated by Oujamon and her Appmon Chip obtained by Eri.

Fakemon

 is a disguise Ultimate Grade Appmon and member of the Ultimate 4. He is defeated by Entermon with his Appmon Chip obtained by Torajirou.

Biomon

 is a life Ultimate Grade Appmon and member of the Ultimate 4. He used his surgical skills to transform Hajime into an Appmon, which he confessed to Rei after he is defeated by Revivemon, but is shut down by Charismon before revealing any further information. Regardless, his Appmon Chip is salvaged by Rei.

Deusmon

 is an omnipotence God Grade Appmon. His Appmon Chip has been secretly carried by Yujin who obtains Bootmon's Appmon Chip to unlock the power that allows Applidrivers to summon God Grade Appmon. After finally summoning Deusmon, Yujin sends it to attack Tokyo and plunge the city into the Net Ocean as part of Leviathan's plan to digitalize and rule over humanity. Deusmon also has an ability to create copies of his body which he used to help fight against Poseidonmon, Uranusmon and Hadesmon. After losing the battle, Deusmon and every other God Grade Appmon are eaten by Leviathan's materialized form who wishes to evolve even further.

Secondary characters

Ai Kashiki

 is a 13 year old Ai and is Haru's classmate whom he has a crush on. She has a kind and gentle personality and is very popular with her peers. She later discovers the existence of Appmon and allows Haru and the others to use the secret basement of her family's bookstore as their base of operations.

Takeru Wato

He is Haru's classmate who likes smartphones, games, and other digital items.

Den'emon Shinkai

 is Haru's late grandfather whose voice served as the base for the one installed in the Applidrives. A pioneer in artificial intelligence and one of the scientists who attended the Dartmouth Workshop in 1956, Den'emon is the creator of Minerva, a benevolent AI which had part of its code become rogue, then evolved into Leviathan. Fearing that Leviathan would eventually attack mankind, he left a VHS tape with a message asking whoever saw said tape to stop him, while uploading a backup of his data once he realized that Leviathan was after his life. His backup reaches Haru and his friends after their AppliDrives were destroyed by the Ultimate 4 and helps them to obtain new AppliDrive DUOs. After Leviathan is defeated, Den'emon is materialized in the real world, but losing the youth he had online.

Hajime Katsura

 is Rei's younger brother, who was kidnapped by Leviathan. After investigating further, Rei discovers that Hajime underwent a mysterious procedure to have his data thoroughly modified, transforming him into something else, but so far it is unknown in who or what he was transformed into. It is later revealed that Hajime has in fact been transformed into the Appmon, Sleepmon. After he is rescued, Hajime reveals that he was captured in order to create the ultimate startup Appmon, Bootmon, in order to complete its plan to transform all mankind into data and rule them.

The Seven Codes
The "Seven Codes" are seven special Appmon that, once reunited, will form the legendary Appmon, Dantemon, able to access the deep web in order to reach Leviathan. After fulfilling their role of summoning Dantemon, they lose their special powers and become common Appmon once more, joining the AppliDrivers against Leviathan.

Code no.1, he is an e-mail Appmon forcefully captured by Rei, who later gives him to Haru. After losing his Seven Code powers, he entrusts his Appmon chip to Haru.

Code no.2, he is a role-playing game Appmon captured by Haru after he calms him down. After losing his Seven Code powers, he entrusts his Appmon chip to Haru.

Code no.3, he is a trash bin Appmon defeated and captured by Eri. After losing his Seven Code powers, he entrusts his Appmon chip to Haru.

Code no.4, she is a fortune teller Appmon. After being infected by the L virus, she is defeated and captured by Eri and Astra. After losing her Seven Code powers, he entrusts her Appmon chip to Eri.

Code no.5, he is a copy and paste Appmon. After being infected by the L virus, he is defeated and captured by Eri. After losing his Seven Code powers, he entrusts his Appmon chip to Eri.

Code no.6, he is a medic Appmon. After being infected by the L virus, he is defeated and captured by Torajirou. After losing his Seven Code powers, he entrusts his Appmon chip to Torajirou.

Code no.7, he is a weather Appmon. After being infected by the L virus, he is defeated and captured by Eri, but later stolen by Mienumon, until Haru and the others defeat her to take it back. After losing his Seven Code powers, he entrusts his Appmon chip to Eri.

Dantemon

A massive and powerful Appmon summoned by the combined power of the Seven Codes,  is able to slay colossal enemies like Cometmon with one slash from his sword. After being summoned, he opens the gate to the deep web for Haru and his friends, but soon after, he is infected by the L Virus and turns into stone, becoming immobile as he holds the gate that links the surface and deep webs open, allowing the AppliDrivers to push forward in their pursuit of Leviathan.

Bootmon

An ultimate Appmon created by Hajime at Leviathan's request,  is released by Hajime when he discovers that Leviathan intends to use it in his plan to digitalize and rule over all mankind. When the Applidrivers manage to find him, he is attacked by Yujin and Shutmon who claim his Appmon Chip to unlock the power needed to summon his two God Grade Appmon, Deusmon and Rebootmon.

Agumon

 is Haru's Digimon partner from the boy's copy of the Digimon Universe videogame, a Reptile Digimon whose signature attack is Baby Flame. When Uratekumon brings various video game characters out of their games in an attempt to locate Bootmon, Agumon avoided being controlled and decides to get the other video game characters back to their game worlds. After a misunderstanding with Haru's group, recognizing him by his user name, Agumon helps in defeating Uratekumon before returning himself and the other game characters to their games.
 Agumon's Mega form, a Dragon Man Digimon clad in Chrome Digizoid armor who fights with improved speed and strength. He is equipped with the Dramon Killer gauntlets, which are weapons specifically designed to defeat Dramon-species Digimon. WarGreymon's two signature attacks are Gaia Force, which involves gathering all of the energy into one spot then firing it as a super-dense, high-temperature fireball energy shot, and Brave Tornado, which involves spinning at himself at a tremendous speed then launching himself at his enemy.

References

External links 
 
 

Universe: Appli Monsters